Scaptesyle violinitens is a moth in the subfamily Arctiinae. It is found in New Guinea.

References

Natural History Museum Lepidoptera generic names catalog

Lithosiini